San Francesco di Paola is a prominent church located to the west in Piazza del Plebiscito, the main square of Naples, Italy.

In the early 19th century, King Joachim Murat of Naples (Napoleon's brother-in-law) planned the entire square and the large building with the colonnades as a tribute to the emperor. When Napoleon was finally dispatched, the Bourbons were restored to the throne of Naples. Ferdinand I continued the construction - finished in 1816 - but converted the final product into the church one sees today. He dedicated it to Saint Francis of Paola, who had stayed in a monastery on this site in the 16th century.

The church is  reminiscent of the Pantheon in Rome. The façade is fronted by a portico resting on six columns and two Ionic pillars. Inside, the church is circular with two side chapels. The portico is by Neapolitan architect Leopoldo Laperuta, while the main building is by the Swiss architect .

Interior
The interior has a number of statues: a San Giovanni Crisostomo by Gennaro Calì, Sant'Ambrogio by Tito Angelini, St Luke by Antonio Calì, a St Matthew by  Carlo Finelli, a St John Evangelist by Pietro Tenerani, St Mark by Giuseppe de Fabris, a Sant'Agostino by Tommaso Arnaud, and a Sant'Attanasio by Angelo Solani.

In the chapels on the right, we find the following altarpieces: San Nicola da Tolentino and St Francis of Paola receives a stem of charity from an Angel, by Nicola Carta, Final Communion of San Ferdinando di Castiglia by Pietro Benvenuti, a Transit di St Joseph by Camillo Gerra, the Immaculate Conception and the death of Sant'Andrea Avellino by Tommaso de Vivo.

Before the main altar, is a 1641 work by Anselmo Cangiano, transferred here in 1835, from the church of the Santi Apostoli. In the apse is a painting of St Francis of Paola resuscitates a dead man by Vincenzo Camuccini. In the sacristy is an Immaculate Conception by Gaspare Landi and a Circumcision of Jesus by Antonio Campi

References

External links
 

Religious organizations established in 1816
Roman Catholic churches completed in 1816
Francesco di Paola
Neoclassical architecture in Naples
1816 establishments in the Kingdom of the Two Sicilies
1816 establishments in Italy
19th-century Roman Catholic church buildings in Italy
Neoclassical church buildings in Italy
Joachim Murat